Pietro Ferrari (April 6, 1906 – ?) was an Italian professional football player.

He played for 3 seasons (27 games, 3 goals) in the Serie A for A.S. Roma and A.S. Casale Calcio.

1906 births
Year of death missing
Italian footballers
Serie A players
A.S. Roma players
Casale F.B.C. players
A.S.D. HSL Derthona players
Association football midfielders